Hector Fonseca (born January 10, 1980 in Bronx, New York City, New York) is an internationally acclaimed house music DJ. In addition to his production and DJ work, Fonseca is one of the music industry's most requested remixers due to his ability to transform many commercially released songs into club hits.

Biography

Early years
Raised in suburban Clifton, New Jersey, in a very tight-knit Puerto Rican family, Hector first started to dabble with notoriety with a brief career as a fashion model. While his success in that industry was limited, Hector decided to pursue other ambitious ventures and later enrolled at the University of Pennsylvania where he majored in business administration for three years. It was in college that his passion for music began to grow, and after serious consideration, he left his studies to focus on the growing tribal and house music scene emerging in New York during the late 1990s.

With his experience and a loyal following of fans, word of mouth began to circulate throughout New York's music scene of Hector's rising stock. Soon, he could boast of residencies at most of New York City's legendary nightclubs such as the Limelight, Heaven, Splash & Roxy, along with numerous national gigs. With a list of venues that read like a who's who of city nightclubs, he soon attracted the attention of his mentor, the late Grammy Award-winning DJ/producer/remixer Peter Rauhofer. Rauhofer, the founder and proprietor of dance music label, Star69 Records, wanted to verify whether or not Fonseca's musical means extended beyond the turntables.

In the summer of 2004, with just two years of producing music under his belt, Fonseca solidified his spot in dance music's hall of fame with his rendition of Jahkey B's single, "Heart Attack". His remix of the song pushed the song to the #8 spot on Billboard's Hot Dance Club Songs chart. His follow-up of Shelia Brody's "U Ain’t that Good" reached #3 on the same chart, further solidifying his reputation as one of the dance music industry's go to remixers.

Career
Credited with starting the now popular "electribal" sound (a mixture of tribal, vocal and electro house), he was voted Out Magazine's Hottest DJ in 2007. Some of the major circuit party events he has headlined in the past include the White Party (both Palm Springs and Miami), the Black Party (New York), the Black and Blue Festival (Montreal), Circuit Festival (Barcelona), the Winter Party (Miami), Amore (Rome), Maxima (Rio de Janeiro), Alegria (New York), Prism Pride (Toronto), and Scream (Paris), to name just a few. In addition to these events, he holds residencies at some of the most popular venues worldwide including "Matinee" (New York City and Ibiza), '"Fly" (Toronto), "Parking" (Montreal), "Score" (Miami), and "Reflex" (Los Angeles).

He has charted dozens of Billboard #1 Dance Chart remixes for various artists including Betty Who, Beyoncé, Erika Jayne, Katy Perry, Kerli, Lenny Kravitz, Lady Gaga, Mel B, Rihanna, Petshop Boys, Sia, and many others. In 2013 he penned his first original composition/collaboration with legendary 80s band Blondie titled "Mile High". He also collaborated in 2014 with club divas Natascha Bessez, Inaya Day, and Maya Simantov for his upcoming self-titled album released by the Audio4play Records label: an independent house music label he started with label partner Theresa Velasquez.

Discography
 Compilation albums
 New York Club Anthems, Vol. 2 (2007)
 New York Club Anthems, Vol. 3 (2008)
 Hector Fonseca Re:mixed, Audio4play (2016)

 As Lead Artist
 Bump (2013)
 Getcha (2013)
 Face (2013)
 Numb (2015)
 Music Never Dies (2015)
 Music Never Dies (2015)
 Game Over (2015)
 Jump 4 Luv (2015)
 Muchacho (2016)
 So Addicted (2016)
 U Want It (2016)
 Fun (2016)
 Deeper Love (Pride) (2017)
 Beautiful (2017)
 Another Club (No Sleep) (2018)
 It's a fine day (2018)
 Utopia (2018)

Selected remixes

 2raumwohnung (featuring Moguai) – "Sex Secret"
 Adele – "Someone Like You"
 Agnez Mo – "Boy Magnet
 Alicia Keys – "Empire State of Mind"
 Amannda – "The Only One"
 Amuka – "U Ain't That Good"
 Andrea Roma – "I Feel The Same"
 Andro-B – "Young & Dumb"
 Aquaria – "Burn Rubber"
 Antoine Clamaran (featuring Digital Mode) – "Gold"
 Avenue D – "Do I Look Like a Slut?"
 Betty Who "All Of You"
 Betty Who "I Love You Always Forever"
 Betty Who "Somebody Loves You"
 Beyoncé (featuring Shakira) – "Beautiful Liar"
 Beyoncé – "Best Thing I Never Had"
 Blair St. Clair – "Call My Life"
 Bimbo Jones – "Freeze"
 Brandy – "Talk About Our Love"
 Brandy – "What About Us?"
 Britney Spears – "Circus"
 Britney Spears – "Hold It Against Me"
 Sheila Brody – "U Ain't That Good"
 Cajjmere Wray – "Ecstasy Queen"
 Cevin Fisher – "Love You Some More"
 Chelly – "Took the Night"
 Cher – "Take It Like A Man"
 Chris Salvatore – "Dirty Love"
 Chris Salvatore – "I Kissed a Boy"
 Ciara – "Like a Boy"
 Club 69 – "I Look Good"
 Club 69 (featuring Kim Cooper) – "The Drama"
 Cyn – "Fantasy Reality"
 Danny Verde – "Pushin to the Top"
 DJ Bruno – "People"
 Dominique Reighard – "On Top of the World"
 Eden XO – "Too Cool To Dance"
 Emily Perry – "Summer On Lock"
 Emily Perry – "Walk In Silence"
 Eminem (featuring Rihanna) – "Love the Way You Lie"
 Erika Jayne – "Party People (Ignite the World)"
 FC Nond – "Control"
 Faithless – "Insomnia"
 Grace Jones – "Slave to the Rhythm"
 Hector Fonseca (featuring Alan T.) – "Get on Top"
 Hector Fonseca – "U Want It"
 Jahkey B (featuring Satta) – "Heart Attack"
 J-Idris – "Stare At The Ocean"
 John Duff – "Girlie"
 Kanye West – "Love Lockdown"
 Katy Perry – "Peacock"
 Kelis – "4th of July (Fireworks)"
 Kelis – "Milkshake"
 Kerli – "Lucky Ones"
 Kim Cooper – "The Drama"
 Kim Petras – "I Don't Want It At All"
 Kirsten – "Break A Little"Kelly Rowland – "Comeback"
 Kylie Minogue – "Love at First Sight"
 La Roux – "Bulletproof"
 La Roux – "Going In For The Kill"
 Lady Gaga – "Bad Romance"
 Lady Gaga – "Born This Way"
 Lady Gaga – "LoveGame"
 Lady Gaga – "Paparazzi"
 Lady Gaga – "Pokerface"
 Lady Gaga – "You and I"
 Lenny Kravitz – "Low"
 LNY TNZ – "After Midnight"
 Lula – "The DJ, The Music, And Me"
 Madonna – "Celebration"
 Madonna – "Ghosttown"
 Meital Dohan – "Yummy Boyz"
 Merlin Moon – "Believe"
 Mike Curcio (featuring Daniella) – "In Your Head"
 Missy Elliott – "Work It"
 Nicki Minaj – "Starships"
 Offer Nissim (featuring Maya) – "Alone"
 Offer Nissim (featuring Maya) – "Be My Boyfriend"
 Offer Nissim (featuring Maya) – "First Time"
 Offer Nissim (featuring Maya) – "On My Own"
 OneRepublic – "Apologize"
 Pet Shop Boys – "Vocal"
 Rhea Litre – "Lovergirl" 
 Ricky Rebel – "Boys & Sometimes Girls" 
 Ricky Rebel – "If You Were My Baby" 
 Ricky Rebel – "Star" 
 Rihanna – "Diamonds"
 Rihanna – "Don't Stop the Music"
 Rihanna – "We Found Love"
 Rihanna – "Where Have You Been"
 Scooby, Ajoshua & Tigra – "Hot Dogs In My Bun"
 Sia – "Chandelier"
 Sia – "Elastic Heart"
 Scissor Sisters – "Let's Have a Kiki"
 Starkillers – "Diskoteka"
 Superchumbo – "Dog"
 Suzanne Palmer – "Eye Can See U"
 Suzanne Palmer – "Show Me"
 Swedish House Mafia (featuring Deborah Cox) – "Leave the World Behind"
 Touvan – "Beat Machine"
 Tulisa Contostavlos – "Lucky Ones"
 Ultra Naté – "Free"
 VIZIN – "I Was Born This Way"
 VIZIN – "You Make Me Feel (Mighty Real)"
 The Wanted – "Chasing the Sun"
 Willow Smith – "Whip My Hair"

See also

List of Puerto Ricans
Electronic dance music
David Morales
Manny Lehman
Hex Hector
Little Louie Vega

References

External links
 on Facebook
 on Instagram
 on Spotify
 on SoundCloud

American dance musicians
American electronic musicians
American house musicians
Male models from New York (state)
Record producers from New York (state)
Club DJs
LGBT DJs
Living people
Musicians from New York City
DJs from New York City
Nightlife in New York City
American people of Puerto Rican descent
Wharton School of the University of Pennsylvania alumni
1980 births
American gay musicians
LGBT Hispanic and Latino American people
20th-century American LGBT people
21st-century American LGBT people